Chauk is a town and river port in Magway Region, north-central Myanmar (Burma), on the Irrawaddy River. It is located across the river from Seikphyu (ဆိပ်ဖြူ) and is connected by a bridge.

History
In 1902, the Chauk-Lonywa oil field was discovered near Chauk, which is presently a major source of income for the town.

On January 2, 2014, Singapore's Interra Resources announced that its jointly controlled entity, Goldpetrol Joint Operating Company Inc., had commenced drilling development well CHK 1177 in the Chauk oil field in Myanmar.

Climate
Located in the “Dry Valley” of central Myanmar in the rain shadow of the Arakan Mountains, Chauk has a borderline hot semi-arid climate (Köppen BSh), being a little too dry to qualify as a tropical savanna climate (Aw) due to the extreme heat and high potential evapotranspiration. Unlike most monsoonal semi-arid climates, the rainy season in the “Dry Valley” is relatively long at around five to seven months, while variability and extreme monthly and daily rainfalls are much lower than usual with this type of climate.

Earthquake
The 6.8 Mw Myanmar earthquake shook north-central Myanmar on August 24, 2016, with a maximum Mercalli intensity of VI (Strong). Four people were killed and several ancient temples were damaged.

Economy
A refinery was built in Chauk for the Chauk-Lonywa oil field that also processes crude oil that comes down a pipeline from Yenangyaung.  The Chauk field was still producing natural gas as of 1995.

Notes

Populated places in Magway Region
Township capitals of Myanmar